, officially , is a district of Chiyoda, Tokyo, Japan. It is a part of the former ward of Kanda. Its postal code is 101-0038.

Geography
Located on the northern part of Chiyoda Ward, this district is adjacent to Chūō Ward (Nihonbashi-Hongokuchō and Yaesu). It borders Kanda-Nishifukudachō on the north, Iwamotochō on the east, and Kajichō on the west.

Education
 operates public elementary and junior high schools. Chiyoda Elementary School (千代田小学校) is the zoned elementary school for Kanda-Mikurachō. There is a freedom of choice system for junior high schools in Chiyoda Ward, and so there are no specific junior high school zones.

References

Districts of Chiyoda, Tokyo